Die Deutschen Inschriften des Mittelalters und der Frühen Neuzeit (DI) (engl.: The German Inscriptions of Medieval and Early Modern Times) is one of the oldest modern endeavours to collect and redact medieval and early modern inscriptions in Europe. The project was instituted by the German linguist Friedrich Panzer (Heidelberg) in association with the historians Karl Brandi (Göttingen) and Hans Hirsch (Vienna) as an interacademic venture of epigraphical publication in 1934. Encompassed are inscriptions ranging from the Early Middle Ages to the year of 1650 (and later on) localized in the areas that are today known as the Federal Republic of Germany, the Republic of Austria and South Tyrol. By now the epigraphical research centers involved have published 81 volumes. An individual volume contains usually the inscriptions of a single city or Landkreis respectively called Politischer Bezirk in Austria. The venture is supported by the German Academies of Sciences in Berlin, Düsseldorf, Göttingen, Heidelberg, Leipzig, Mainz and München as well as the Austrian Academy of Sciences in Vienna. The Reichert-Verlag is the publishing house of the scientific editions.

Deutsche Inschriften Online (DIO) 
The project "Deutsche Inschriften Online" (engl.: German Inscriptions Online) was planned and implemented as an interacademic venture by the Academies of Sciences in Mainz and Göttingen. The project's aim was to digitise the volumes DI 66/45/56/58/61 and make them available online. The realisation is based on a database which was developed by the Inscription-offices in Greifswald and Mainz. The venture has an innovative character. It is a broadening of the project "Inschriften Mittelrhein-Hunsrück (IMH)" (engl.: Inscriptions of the Middlerhine-Hunsrück) conducted in 2008 in cooperation with the "Institut für Geschichtliche Landeskunde an der Universität Mainz" (engl.: Institute for Regional History located at the University of Mainz). The project digitised the volume "Die Inschriften des Rhein-Hunsrück Kreises I (DI 60)" (engl.: The Inscriptions of the Rhine-Hunsrück District) edited by epigraphist Eberhard J. Nikitsch. In the meantime the website of the IMH-Project has merged into the DIO-Web portal. There is a long term plan for digitising and making available online further volumes; and well as providing an English translation of the DIO-Website.

Besides the digitized scientific volumes DIO features; an advanced search interface; information concerning epigraphy; a number of regular series, on topics such as "Epigraphischer Tipp" (engl.: Epigraphical Hint) and "Inschrift im Fokus" (engl.: Focused on Inscription); a glossary; and a list of topical weblinks. In addition the site presents a wide range of photographic images and illustrations of inscriptions or similar objects as a means of interlinking all possible information.

Currently (January 2020) there are 47 volumes available on the database. These are the following volumes:

 DI-19 Göttingen
 DI-24 St. Michaeliskloster in Lüneburg and the monastery Lüne until 1550
DI-25 Landkreis Ludwigsburg
 DI-26 Osnabrück
 DI-28 Hameln
DI-29 Worms
DI-30 Landkreis Calw
 DI-31 Aachen Cathedral
 DI-32 Aachen
 DI-34 Landkreis Bad Kreuznach
 DI-35 Braunschweig until 1528
 DI-36 Hannover
 DI-37 Rems-Murr-Kreis
 DI-38 Landkreis Bergstraße
 DI-41 Landkreis Göppingen
 DI-42 Einbeck
 DI-45 Goslar
 DI-46 Minden
 DI-49 Darmstadt and the Landkreis Darmstadt-Dieburg and Landkreis Groß-Gerau
 DI-50 Bonn
DI-51 Wiesbaden
 DI-56 Braunschweig from 1529 to 1671
 DI-58 Hildesheim
 DI-59 Lemgo
 DI-60 Rhein-Hunsrück-Kreis I (Boppard, Oberwesel, St. Goar)
 DI-61 Helmstedt
DI-62 Landkreis Weißenfels
DI-63 Odenwaldkreis
 DI-64 former Landkreis Querfurt
 DI-66 Landkreis Göttingen
DI-67 Passau up to the town fire of 1662
DI-69 Freising
DI-74 Regensburg II. St. Peter's cathedral 1 (up to 1500)
DI-75 Halberstadt Cathedral
 DI-76 The Lüneburgian monasteries Ebstorf, Isenhagen, Lüne, Medingen, Walsrode, Wienhausen
 DI-77 Greifswald
DI-78 Baden-Baden and Landkreis Rastatt
DI-79 Rhein-Hunsrück-Kreis II (former Landkreis Simmern and western part of the former Landkreis St. Goar)
DI-80 Landkreis Passau I. The former districts of Passau and Wegscheid
DI-81 Essen
DI-83 Landkreis Holzminden
DI-84 Landkreis Weilheim-Schongau up to 1650
DI-85 Halle an der Saale
DI-86 Halberstadt
DI-88 Landkreis Hildesheim
DI-89 Düsseldorf
DI-95 Regensburg. St. Peter's Cathedral 2 (from 1501 to 1700)
DI-96 Landkreis Northeim
DI-99 Ingolstadt
In addition, there are six online catalogues, which are either only available in digital form or have not been published in print within the edition series "Die Deutschen Inschriften".

 DIO-1 The Inscriptions of the City of Mainz. First Part: The Inscriptions of the Cathedral and the Museum of Cathedral and Diocese ranging from 800 to 1350
 DIO-2 Gandersheim Abbey and her own monasteries Brunshausen and Clus
 DIO-3 Santa Maria dell'Anima in Rome
 DIO-4 Mariental monastery
DIO-5 Nail-Chapel of the Bamberg Cathedral
DIO-6 Textile inscriptions of the city of Bamberg
The Heidelberg Academy of Sciences has made another five volumes available online as digital copies.
DI-4 Wimpfen am Neckar
DI-5 City of Munich and Landkreis Munich
DI-13 Cemeteries of St. John's, St. Rochus and Wöhrd in Nuremberg
DI-15 Rothenburg ob der Tauber
DI-17 Landkreis Haßberge

Other collaborative projects 

The team responsible for the DIO archive has also launched the online publication of a database of inscriptions in the “German national church” Santa Maria dell’Anima in Rome.  This database contains inscriptions dating from mediaeval times to 1559; it was published in collaboration with the German Historical Institute in Rome. Another interdisciplinary project closely related to DIO is St. Stephen virtual, a project run jointly by several institutes and academic departments in Mainz. Its goal was to make information from the database accessible to the general public by simulating a "virtual visit" of the interior cloister of St. Stephen's Church, Mainz.

The aim of the project Referenzkorpus historischer Texte des Deutschen (Engl. linguistic corpus of German language texts) is to annotate the grammatical structure of texts. It is planned to make the annotated texts available online within the Referenzkorpus Deutsche Inschriften (Engl. linguistic corpus of German inscriptions), with an estimated 400,000 annotated word forms.

See also 

 Digital humanities

References

Bibliography

German Inscriptions (DI) 
 Karl Brandi: Grundlegung einer deutschen Inschriftenkunde (Engl. foundation of a lore of German epigraphy). In: Deutsches Archiv für Erforschung des Mittelalters Bd. 1 (1937) S. 11-43.
 Ernst Cucuel: Das deutsche Inschriftenwerk der vereinigten Akademien, seine Aufgaben, Ziele und Methoden (Eng. the German epigraphical opus of the united Academies of Sciences, its tasks, goals and method). In: Blätter für deutsche Landesgeschichte Bd. 85 (1939) S. 116-134.
 Deutsche Inschriften. Terminologie zur Schriftbeschreibung (Engl. German inscriptions. Terminology for the description of epigraphical scriptures). Erarb. von den Mitarb. der Inschriftenkommission der Akademien der Wissenschaften in Berlin. Wiesbaden 1999.
 Rudolf Maria Kloos: Die deutschen Inschriften (Engl. the German inscriptions). In: Deutsches Archiv für Erforschung des Mittelalters Bd. 15 (1959) S. 177–181.
 Rudolf Maria Kloos: Die Deutschen Inschriften. Ein Bericht über das deutsche Inschriftenunternehmen (Engl. the German inscriptions. Memorandum on the German epigraphical enterprise). In: Studi medievali Ser. 3, Bd. 14 (1973) S. 335-362.
 Eberhard J. Nikitsch: Fritz V. Arens als Mainzer Inschriftensammler und Epigraphiker (Engl. Fritz V. Arens as collector of inscriptions in Mainz and epigraph). In: Mainzer Zeitschrift Bd. 103 (2008) S. 231-243.
 Friedrich Panzer: Die Inschriften des deutschen Mittelalters. Ein Aufruf zu ihrer Sammlung und Bearbeitung (Engl. Inscriptions of the German Middle Ages. Appeal for collecting and editing). Im Auftrage der Akademien der Wissenschaften von Berlin, Göttingen, Heidelberg, Leipzig, München und Wien verfasst. Leipzig 1938.

German Inscriptions Online (DIO) 
 Paul Sebastian Moos/Eberhard J. Nikitsch: Blick in die Historikerwerkstatt: Die Arbeitswelt des Epigraphikers. Historische Hilfswissenschaft und ihre Bedeutung für Geschichte und Wissenschaft – ein römischer Erfahrungsbericht (=A Glance into the Historian’s Workshop: The Working World of the Epigrapher. The Historical Auxiliary Sciences and Their Significance for Historical and Academic Studies – a Roman Experience Report) (URN: urn:nbn:de:0289-2012050312) In: Skriptum 2 (2012), Nr. 1. (The historians outline their work, describe the various steps editioning the epigraphical corpus of the Santa Maria dell’Anima, and locate their auxiliary science within modern historical and cultural studies. It also provides the reader with an informative overview of the working environment of an epigrapher at the German Historical Institute in Rome.) 
 Anna Neovesky: St. Stephan virtuell – ein internetgestützter Panoramarundgang durch die Mainzer Stephanskirche – Entwicklung und Umsetzung eines Projektes im Bereich der digitalen Geisteswissenschaften. (= St. Stephen virtual – digital walkabout around the interiour cloister of  St. Stephen’s Church – genesis and implementation of a Digital Humanities project) (URN: urn:nbn:de:0289-2012110220) In: Skriptum 2 (2012), Nr. 2.  ( The essay describes the planning and technical realization of an interdisciplinary project of the Digital Humanities, using the example of “St. Stephan virtual”. This project was accomplished with the cooperation of the „Deutsche Inschriften“ and the Digital Academy of the ADWL Mainz, the Institute for Regional History and Culture at the University Mainz and the i3mainz – the Institute for Spatial Information and Surveying Technology at the University of Applied Sciences Mainz.) 
 Schrade, Torsten: Epigraphik im digitalen Umfeld (=Epigraphy in the Digital Field). (URN: urn:nbn:de:0289-2011051816). In: Skriptum 1 (2011), Nr. 1. ISSN 2192-4457. (Article available under Creative Commons-Licence; the article overviews genesis and development of DIO) 
 Torsten Schrade: Vom Inschriftenband zum Datenobjekt. Die Entwicklung des epigraphischen Fachportals „Deutsche Inschriften Online.“ (=From scholarly edition to data object. The evolution of the scholarly web portal “German Inscriptions Online”). In: Inschriften als Zeugnisse kulturellen Gedächtnisses – 40 Jahre Deutsche Inschriften in Göttingen. Beiträge zum Jubiläumskolloquium vom 22. Oktober 2010 in Göttingen, herausgegeben von Nikolaus Henkel. Reichert Verlag, Wiesbaden 2012, S. 59–72.

External links

German Inscriptions (DI) 
The German Inscriptions of Medieval and Early Modern Times (DIO) - Mainpage (german)
 Description of the project “German Inscriptions Online” at the departement “Digital Academy” of the ADWL Mainz
Excerpts from the Hessian volumes of the Cenotaph-Project
 Volume DI-60: „Die Inschriften des Rhein-Hunsrück-Kreises I (Boppard, Oberwesel, St. Goar)“ (Engl. Inscriptions of the Rhine-Hunsrück administrative district) as booklet (downloads)
 Volumes of the series “German Inscriptions” in the German national library via RI-Opac
 Berlin series (Inscription-office vacant)
 Düsseldorf series (Inscription-office Bonn)
 Göttingen series (Inscription-office Göttingen and Greifswald)
 Leipzig series (Inscription-office Halle)
 Heidelberg series (Inscription-office Heidelberg)
 Mainz series (Inscription-office Mainz)
 Munich series (Inscription-office Munich)
 Vienna series (Inscription-office Vienna)

Projects of Cooperation 
 Epigraphical Research- and Documentation-Center Munich
 Project Inscriptions in their Spatial Context (IBR)
 Referenzkorpus Deutsche Inschriften: Project Linguistic Corpus of German Inscriptions (Uni Bochum); Project at the faculty of German philology (Uni Bochum)

Historiography of Germany
!
!